The 2023 Fairleigh Dickinson Knights men's volleyball team, the second Fairleigh Dickinson men's volleyball team, represents Fairleigh Dickinson University in the 2023 NCAA Division I & II men's volleyball season. The Knights, led by second year head coach Karl France, play their home games at Rothman Center. The Knights compete as a member of the newly created Northeast Conference men's volleyball conference. The Knights were picked to finish sixth in the NEC pre-season poll.

Season highlights
Will be filled in as the season progresses.

Roster

Schedule
TV/Internet Streaming information:
All home games will be streamed on NEC Front Row. Most road games will be streamed by the schools streaming service.

 *-Indicates conference match.
 Times listed are Eastern Time Zone.

Announcers for televised games
American International: Ryan Beebe
American International: Mark Ernay
BYU: Jarom Jordan, Steve Vail, & Lauren McClain
BYU: Jarom Jordan, Steve Vail, & Lauren McClain
St. Francis: 
CSUN: 
LIU: 
St. Francis Brooklyn: 
Merrimack: 
Sacred Heart: 
Princeton: 
St. Francis: 
Belmont Abbey: 
George Mason: 
George Mason: 
Daemen: 
D'Youville: 
Merrimack: 
Sacred Heart: 
LIU: 
St. Francis Brooklyn: 
Daemen: 
D'Youville:

References

2023 in sports in New Jersey
Fairleigh Dickinson
Fairleigh Dickinson